The first 20 years of video game developing in Sweden was mostly done by separate individuals. Developing costs increased and industry structure became more complex over time. Mapping the business of Swedish game developing history has been relatively problematic because individuals were spread all over the country working with different platforms in PDP, C64, VIC-20, Amiga and PC. Home computers became the focus for the creativity among often self learned youths who got access during the 1980s.

In 2018, the Swedish games industry generated €1.8 billion and it employed almost 8,000 people.
For 2017, there were 4.2 million gamers in Sweden who spent $411.7 million.

1980-1989 
The colour-graphical VIC-20 home computer was released in 1980. The home computer Commodore 64 was released 1983. The game Space Action (1983) was developed by Arne Fernlund and published by Handic Software.

After 20 years game development shifted towards project groups of game developers.

List of Swedish video game companies

References

See also 
 List of video game companies of Sweden (Check this for possible extra details of relevant companies & their pages)